Aline Camboulives (born 13 July 1973) is a French long-distance runner who specialises in mountain running and road running. Triple French champion of Marathon (2011, 2012 and 2015), she was previously a cyclist, member of the French team in 2002.

Biography
Aline Camboulives was born in Valence and began her sporting career as a cyclist from 1998 to 2003. She was a member of the French team in 2002 and came 20th in the women's Tour de France. The same year, she won the French Women's Road Cycling Cup. On 19 June 2003, during the penultimate stage of the Tour de la Drôme, she falls, causing a fracture of the femoral head which imposes six months of rehabilitation. She temporarily stopped the competition to devote herself to her professional activity.

She returns to competition in running, considering the training less time-consuming than cycling and therefore more compatible with running her own business. She soon experienced successes on 10 km, trail, mountain marathons, half-marathon and the marathon,.

Since 2006, Aline Camboulives has appeared on virtually all the podiums of the great classics of mountain racing: Zermatt Marathon, (the World Championships in long-distance mountain races on 4 July 2015) which she won three times on three occasions, Sierre-Zinal, the Jungfrau Marathon.

Achievements

Performances

France / Europe / World Championship
 2017 (44 y.o.) : FC half-marathon V1 (1. Ind)  
 2016 (43 y.o.) : FC Ekiden : Ekiden (  Ind)  
 2015 (42 y.o.) : FC half-marathon : Semi-Marath. (  Ind) 
 2015 (42 y.o.) : FC Ekiden : Ekiden (  Ind) 
 2015 (42 y.o.) : FC Marathon : Marathon (  Ind)
 2015 (42 y.o.) : FC Mountain running (  Ind)  
 2014 (41 y.o.) : WC half-marathon : Semi-Marath. (finale) 69. 1h17'46"
 2014 (41 y.o.) : FC Mountain running (1.  Ind) - Montagne V1 (1.  Ind)  
 2013 (40 y.o.) : FC half-marathon : Semi-Marath. TC (  Ind) 
 2013 (40 y.o.) : FC Marathon : Marathon V1 (1.  Ind) 
 2013 (40 y.o.) : FC Mountain running V1 (1.  Ind)  
 2012 (39 y.o.) : FC Marathon : Marathon (  Ind) 
 2012 (39 y.o.) : FC Mountain running: Montagne (  Ind)  
 2011 (38 y.o.) : EC Marathon : Marathon TC (  Ind)  
 2007 (34 y.o.) : EC Mountain running (finalist) 14. 57'01"

FC: France Championship, EC: Europe Championship, WC: World Championship

References

External links
 Aline Camboulives, profile at all-athletics.com

1973 births
Living people
French female long-distance runners
French female marathon runners
Sportspeople from Valence, Drôme